Monaeses attenuatus, is a species of spider of the genus Monaeses. It is endemic to Sri Lanka.

See also
 List of Thomisidae species

References

Thomisidae
Endemic fauna of Sri Lanka
Spiders of Asia
Spiders described in 1899